The 2020 Golden Gala was the 40th edition of the annual outdoor track and field meeting in Rome, Italy. Held on 17 September at the Stadio Olimpico, it was the seventh leg of the 2020 Diamond League – the highest level international track and field circuit. Originally meant to be staged in Naples, Italy in the month of May, the meet had been delayed and was closed to in-stadium spectators due to the COVID-19 pandemic.

After fourteen attempts prior to the meeting during the outdoor season, the world indoor record holder for Sweden, Mondo Duplantis, set the outdoor world best in the men's pole vault with a height of 6.15 metres. Though the mark was 0.03 less than his indoor record, it was 0.01 more than the previous outdoor best set by Sergey Bubka. Ben Broeders placed second with a height of 5.80 metres, a Belgian record.

A world leading time was also set in the men's 3000 metres by Jacob Kiplimo, winning in 7:26.64 which was also a Diamond League record, a meeting record, and a Ugandan record. The time made the 19-year old #8 on the all-time list, with second place Jakob Ingebrigtsen, also 19 years old, going #9 all-time with a Norwegian record (7:27.05). Australian Stewart McSweyn set an Oceanian record (7:28.02) to place third, with fourth place Yemaneberhan Crippa also setting an Italian record (7:38.27).

Karsten Warholm clocked his fifth sub-48 seconds in the men's 400 metres hurdles in the 2020 season, winning in 47.07 seconds to set a meeting record and the top five times in the event that year.

In the women's events, Elaine Thompson-Herah ran a world leading time in her first international race in the 100 metres with a time of 10.85 seconds, taking one hundredth of a second off fellow Jamaican Shelly-Ann Fraser-Pryce's previous world leading time of 10.86 seconds.

Results
Because of the disrupted season with several cancelled meets, no Diamond League points were awarded for athlete placements.

Men

Women

See also
2020 Doha Diamond League (next and last meet in the 2020 Diamond League)

References

Results
"Wanda Diamond League Rome (ITA) 17th September 2020 Results lists". Diamond League (2020-09-23). Retrieved 2021-05-05.

External links
Official Diamond League Golden Gala website

Golden Gala
Golden Gala
Golden Gala, 2020
September 2020 sports events in Italy
Golden Gala